Power and Empire (stylized as Tom Clancy Power and Empire, Tom Clancy: Power and Empire or Tom Clancy's Power and Empire in the United Kingdom) is a political thriller novel, written by Marc Cameron and released on November 28, 2017. Set in the Tom Clancy universe, President Jack Ryan and The Campus must prevent a secret cabal heightening the tensions between the United States and China from causing a violent coup in the Chinese government. Power and Empire is Cameron's first book in the Jack Ryan series, succeeding Mark Greaney. It debuted at number six on the New York Times bestseller list.

Plot summary
Zhao Chengzhi was appointed as President of China after the death of his predecessor Wei Zhen Lin years prior (depicted in Threat Vector). However, his moderate stance on national and international issues angers hardliners in the Chinese government, particularly Foreign Minister Li Zhengsheng, who perceives him to be a weakling. He then creates a secret cabal of like-minded government officials that plots to escalate tensions between China and the United States, which would lead to U.S. President Jack Ryan invoking the Ryan Doctrine and order to have Zhao killed on account of his supposed recklessness, therefore paving the way for Li's ascension into power.

In this elaborate plot, Foreign Minister Li recruits General Xu Jinlong, the head of the Central Security Bureau, to sabotage a Chinese commercial ship, which later explodes near American waters; the nearby United States Coast Guard on the northern West Coast manages to rescue most of its crew after it sank, but ten men are either dead or missing. The incident was meant to be the first step toward provoking the United States, but President Ryan urges caution.

In addition, Foreign Minister Li enlists agent provocateur Vincent Chen, codenamed Coronet, to orchestrate a series of attacks led by terrorist groups to further his diabolical plan: on an oil drilling operation in Chad (American soldiers, who were on a military exercise nearby, assist and are killed by Boko Haram) and a private sailboat near Indonesia (by allowing its occupants to call for help, Jemaah Islamiyah pirates aim to lure a nearby American patrol ship so that they can in turn attack it). President Ryan discovers the Chinese connection to the incidents, but is still cautious.

Meanwhile, Taiwanese journalist Eddie Feng, who has first-hand access to the Chinese government, had been investigating a subway bombing in China, where he finds out that Coronet is responsible, when he discovers his connection to a sex trafficking ring in Texas. This attracts The Campus's attention, which then surveils Feng through several nightclubs in Dallas. A young prostitute named Magdalena Rojas later steals Feng's flash drive containing classified information, which she believes will free her; however, she gives it to her fellow prostitute Blanca for safekeeping when she was sold to a buyer. Blanca and her owner later get pulled over by a state trooper, who then rescues the young girl from the trafficker in the resulting altercation.

Following up on Blanca and Feng's flash drive, a team of FBI investigators specializing in child trafficking cases and led by Kelsey Callahan arrest Feng in a nightclub. The Campus operative Dominic “Dom” Caruso uses his FBI credentials to join the investigation and to retrieve the flash drive. The Campus find out information about Chen's next whereabouts, which is at an agriculture conference in Buenos Aires, Argentina; Foreign Minister Li will be in attendance. Caruso as well as John Clark remain in Texas to investigate Chen's connection to the sex trafficking ring in Texas, while Domingo “Ding” Chavez, Jack Ryan Jr., Bartosz “Midas” Jankowski, and Adara Sherman proceed to Buenos Aires for surveillance on Chen.

Foreign Minister Li secretly uses the conference as an opportunity to stage an assassination attempt on himself, which he believes will make him more popular back in China, through Chen and his henchmen. They detonate a bomb at the conference's venue, killing and injuring some of the attendees and bystanders. The Campus witness the incident and later meet up with Monzaki Yukiko, a Japanese intelligence officer who was also there to surveil Chen in connection with an espionage case in her country. They later find out that Chen and his colleagues are going to Japan, which they believe is in connection with the upcoming G20 international summit, and follow them there.

Back in Texas, Clark launches a one-man war on the sex trafficking ring in pursuit of Chen's connection to them as well as Magdalena; meanwhile, Callahan becomes suspicious about Caruso and his “friend” as the bodies pile up. Clark eventually finds out that Chen's sister, Lily, is a business partner with Emilio Zambrano, an upper boss of the sex trafficking gang, and that they have Magdalena. He tries to rescue the young prostitute and kill Lily and Zambrano in their lakehouse when Callahan, along with Caruso, arrives in time to fight off Lily and her henchmen as well as to retrieve Magdalena (she had looked into Caruso's phone records, leading her to Clark's whereabouts). She later arrests Clark for murder.

In the East China Sea, a Defense Intelligence Agency research vessel monitoring Chinese submarine traffic in the area suffers an engine malfunction and is being steered toward Chinese waters by the approaching tropical storm. President Ryan personally calls President Zhao regarding the situation; the Chinese leader holds off on intercepting the ship as long as it does not reach Chinese waters. After its crew was rescued by a nearby Taiwanese patrol vessel, the surveillance ship is scuttled, overriding an attempt by a Chinese destroyer in the vicinity to seize it despite President Zhao's assurances. As a result, President Ryan becomes distrustful of the Chinese leader.

Meanwhile, The Campus eventually find Chen and his colleagues in Tokyo, where they see Yukiko yet again tracking them. They engage in a gunfight, killing Chen and most of his henchmen. Intelligence from Chen's laptop, captured by The Campus, indicate Chen's connection to Foreign Minister Li. Ryan and Yukiko then advance to the venue of the G20 summit as President Zhao arrives for the summit with President Ryan. Jack Junior recognizes the Chinese leader's bodyguards as the same men on Foreign Minister Li's protection detail in Argentina (they were last-minute additions to Zhao's agents who were suspiciously killed back in Beijing). He scrambles to contact his father in the middle of the summit meeting of the impending assassination plot. President Ryan relays his son's message to the Chinese leader as well as their respective principal bodyguards; Zhao's bodyguard kills the would-be assassin standing watch outside the meeting room, and the respective leaders are then whisked off to safety.

Foreign Minister Li as well as his co-conspirators are later arrested for treason. Meanwhile, Clark was released from police custody, much to Callahan's chagrin.

Characters

The White House
 Jack Ryan: President of the United States
 Scott Adler: Secretary of state
 Mary Pat Foley: Director of national intelligence
 Robert Burgess: Secretary of defense
 Jay Canfield: Director of the Central Intelligence Agency
 Arnold "Arnie" van Damm: President Ryan's chief of staff
 Gary Montgomery: Special agent in charge of Presidential Protection Detail, United States Secret Service

The Campus
 John Clark
 Domingo "Ding" Chavez
 Jack Ryan, Jr.
 Dominic "Dom" Caruso
 Adara Sherman
 Bartosz "Midas" Jankowski
 Gavin Biery
 Lisanne Robertson: Campus director of transportation
 Monzaki Yukiko: Japanese intelligence operative

U.S. Coast Guard Air Station Port Angeles
 Lieutenant Commander Andrew Slaznik: MH-65 Dolphin helicopter pilot
 Petty Officer 2nd Class Lance Kitchen: Dolphin rescue swimmer

Cyclone-class patrol ship USS Rogue
 Lieutenant Commander Jimmy Akana: Captain
 Petty Officer 2nd Class Raymond Cooper: RQ-20 Puma operator

VBSS RHIB crew
 Lieutenant Junior Grade Steven Gitlin
 Chief Petty Officer Bill Knight
 Chief Petty Officer Bobby Rose
 Petty Officer Peavy
 Petty Officer Ridgeway

USS Meriwether
 Dave Holloway: Captain

People's Republic of China
 Zhao Chengzhi: General Secretary of the Chinese Communist Party
 Huang Ju: Colonel, Central Security Bureau; President Zhao's principal protection officer
 Li Zhengsheng: Foreign Minister
 Xu Jinlong: Lieutenant general, People's Liberation Army; director of Central Security Bureau
 Ma Xiannian: General, People's Liberation Army
 Long Yun: Colonel, Central Security Bureau; Foreign Minister Li's principal protective officer

Texas
 Eddie Feng: Taiwanese journalist
 Magdalena Rojas: Thirteen-year-old victim of sex trafficking
 Blanca Limón: Thirteen-year-old victim of sex trafficking
 Ernie Pacheco, aka Matarife (The Slaughterer)
 Lupe: "Bottom girl" who works for Matarife
 Emilio Zambrano: Upper boss in cartel
 Roy Calderon: Texas Department of Public Safety trooper
 Kelsey Callahan: FBI special agent, commander of the Dallas Crimes Against Children Task Force
 John Olson: Special agent, FBI, on CAC Task Force

Development
On February 20, 2017, The Real Book Spy announced that principal authors in the Tom Clancy universe, Mark Greaney and Grant Blackwood are leaving the franchise. Blackwood was replaced by Mike Maden for the summer-release Jack Ryan Jr. novels, while Greaney was replaced by Cameron for the fall-release Jack Ryan novels. Long-time Tom Clancy editor Tom Colgan stated that it was Greaney who recommended the author of the bestselling Jericho Quinn thrillers as his replacement: “I wish I could take credit for thinking of Marc Cameron for the Jack Sr. book but it was actually Mark Greaney who suggested him. He had just read Marc Cameron’s most recent book and thought he would be a good fit. Boy, was he right. From the start, Marc Cameron just really got Jack Ryan and John Clark and all the rest of the characters. I’m excited to see Mike and Marc continue the Clancy tradition.” Speaking of his choice, Greaney said: “Marc was the first and only name I gave him. His writing is both intelligent and action-packed, and Marc has an impressive personal resume that I am sure he will work into the novels to great effect.”

Cameron researched for the book by visiting Tokyo, Japan and Buenos Aires, Argentina, which would later feature in his book. He also visited the real-life U.S. Coast Guard Air Station in Port Angeles near Seattle, Washington, and interviewed its crew. Then he spent six months writing Power and Empire. To ensure consistency with the Clancy novels, he and his wife spent their winter in Cook Islands reading Clancy works, in what he dubbed as Clancy University. He said of the process: “I didn’t want to be a ventriloquist. It was clear I had to write a Marc Cameron book in the spirit of Tom Clancy. It would really be a disservice if I tried to imitate him. It would have been tinny.”

Reception

Commercial
Power and Empire debuted at number six at the Combined Print & E-Book Fiction Books category, as well as number seven at the Hardcover Fiction Books category of the New York Times bestseller list for the week of December 17, 2017. In addition, it debuted at number ten at the USA Today Best-Selling Books list for the week of December 7, 2017.

Critical
Power and Empire received generally positive reviews. Publishers Weekly praised Cameron: "All the writers who have contributed to this series since Clancy’s death have been good, but Cameron’s formidable performance puts him at the head of the pack." Kirkus Reviews hailed it as "Another turbocharged, take-no-prisoners Ryan yarn." In a featured review, thriller novel reviewer The Real Book Spy lauded the book as "a terrific, high-concept political thriller written with the same finesse and style that Clancy’s fans have come to expect."

References

Political thriller novels
2017 American novels
American thriller novels
Techno-thriller novels
Ryanverse
Novels set in Japan
Novels set in the Philippines
Novels set in Indonesia
Novels set in Asia
Novels set in Argentina
Novels set in South America
G. P. Putnam's Sons books
Japan in non-Japanese culture